The Palici (Ancient Greek: ,), or Palaci, were a pair of indigenous Sicilian chthonic deities in Roman mythology, and to a lesser extent in Greek mythology. They are mentioned in Ovid's Metamorphoses V, 406, and in Virgil's Aeneid IX, 585. Their cult centered on three small lakes that emitted sulphurous vapors in the Palagonia plain, and as a result these twin brothers were associated with geysers and the underworld. There was also a shrine to the Palaci in Palacia, where people could subject themselves or others to tests of reliability through divine judgement; passing meant that an oath could be trusted.

Genealogy
The mythological lineage of the Palici is uncertain. One version of the legend attributes their parentage to sky god Zeus and nymph Aetna. Others associate their birth to a coupling between Aetna herself and smith deity Hephaestus. The "Greek version" indicate they are sons of Zeus and another nymph, called Thaleia.<ref>Witczak K. T., Zawiasa D. (2004). "Palici – the Sicilian Twin Brothers and the Indo- European Myth about Divine Twins". In: Živa Antika [Antiquité Vivante] 54(1–2), 2004, pp. 55–57.</ref> A third account claimed that the Palici were the sons of the Sicilian deity Adranus.

The medieval Vatican Mythographers book ascribed their lineage to Zeus and Aetna: Zeus (Jupiter) impregnated Aetna and she, fearing the wrath of Hera (Juno), was entrusted to Earth to protect her and her sons.

Interpretations
The second book of the Vatican Mythographers translated their name as 'twice-born'.

Scholar Marcel Meulder argues for a Proto-Indo-European origin for their name, and relates it to a group of Greek compound names that belong to the semantic field of colours (e.g., leuko 'white'; melas 'black'). Thus, their name would mean 'of a white colour, of a grey colour, of a yellow colour' ("blanchâtre, jaunâtre, grisâtre”"). He also suggests it as evidence of the Indo-European character of the Siculian language.

Polish historian Krzysztof Tomasz Witczak and Daria Zawiasa suggest the Palici may derive from the old Indo-European mytheme of the divine twins. They argue that the pair fit some of the common traits that scholar Donald J. Ward ascribed to the mytheme, such as a sky-god's paternity and a single designation for both twins.

Notes

 References 
Hammond, N.G.L. & Scullard, H.H. (eds.). The Oxford Classical Dictionary (Oxford; Oxford University Press. 1970).
Wilson, R.J.A. Sicily under the Roman Empire (Warminster: Aris and Phillips, 1990), p. 278.
 Maniscalco, Laura (ed.). Il santuario dei Palici: un centro di culto nella Valle del Margi (Palermo: Regione Siciliana, 2008) (Collana d'Area. Quaderno n. 11).
 
 Meurant, Alain. Les Paliques, dieux jumeaux siciliens''. Louvain-la-Neuve: Peeters, 1998. .

Further reading

 
 
 
 
 

Archeology
 
 

Greek gods
Roman gods
Children of Zeus
Children of Hephaestus
Demigods in classical mythology
Sicilian characters in Greek mythology